The Calico Liberty is a roller-delayed blowback-operated semi-automatic rifle (Liberty II) or pistol (Liberty III) chambered for the 9 mm Parabellum round, designed by Calico Light Weapons Systems. These firearms use an unusual 50 or 100-round helical magazine that allow for a large number of rounds in a relatively compact and convenient package. The spent cartridges are discharged in an unusual fashion as well: downward, ahead of the trigger guard. This makes it relatively easy to fit an effective device to catch the cartridge cases, which can then be reloaded. A full-automatic (machine gun) version is available for military, police and other government agencies.

External links
 9mm Liberty III Pistol – Calico Firearms

Semi-automatic rifles
Rifles of the United States